Death Trip is a 2015 Chinese thriller film directed by Billy Tang. It was released on May 15, 2015, in China.

Cast
Victor Wong
Zeng Yongti
Han Bo-reum
Chen Feng
Law Kar-ying

Reception
By May 15, the film had grossed  at the Chinese box office.

References

2015 thriller films
Chinese thriller films
Films directed by Billy Tang
2010s Mandarin-language films